Gérard Korsten (born 1960) is an Austrian musician and conductor.

Life 
Born in Pretoria, Korsten studied violin at the Curtis Institute of Music in Philadelphia with Ivan Galamian as well as in Salzburg with Sándor Végh. He was initially concertmaster of the Camerata Salzburg, and in 1987 took up the post of concertmaster with the Chamber Orchestra of Europe for nine years. Engagements followed as music director at the Teatro Lirico di Cagliari (Sardinia), music director of the London Mozart Players, chief conductor in Uppsala and at the Opera house in Pretoria, and as chief conductor of the Symphony Orchestra Vorarlberg in Bregenz.

Recordings 
as conductor
 2011: Richard Strauss: The Egyptian Helena, Dynamic 374/1-2
 2010: Lehár: Die Lustige Witwe, Virgin Classics 96136
 2008: Donizetti: Lucia Di Lammermoor, Dynamic 576/1-2
 2004: Donizetti: Don Pasquale, Tdk   USOPDP
 1999: Crusell: Clarinet Concertos, Uppsala Co, Naxos 8554144

External links 
 

 Gérard Korsten bei discogs, retrieved 2 June 2021

References 

Austrian conductors (music)
Austrian classical violinists
1960 births
Living people
People from Pretoria